Northern Cordillera forests is a taiga ecoregion that extends across the northern interior of British Columbia, southern Yukon, and a small area of the Northwest Territories as defined by the World Wildlife Fund (WWF) categorization system.

Setting
This ecoregion occupies a transitional region of mountains, valleys, and high plateaus between the Coast and Saint Elias Mountains to the west, and the Northern Rocky Mountains to the east.

Climate
This ecoregion has a predominantly subarctic climate (Köppen  Dfc ) with cool summers and cold winters. Mean annual precipitation is approximately 350-600 mm, but increases up to 1000 mm at higher elevations. The highest elevations feature an alpine tundra climate.

Ecology

Flora
The lower mountains and valleys are dominated by alpine fir, Engelmann spruce, lodgepole pine, and black and white spruce all intermixed with a variety of deciduous shrubs. Higher elevations are dominated by dwarf birch, willow, and a variety of dwarf ericaceous shrubs. The highest elevations are dominated by grass, lichen, and moss.

Fauna
Fauna found throughout this ecoregion include grizzly bear, black bear, moose, mountain goat, beaver, red fox, wolves, ptarmigan, and snowy owl.

Conservation
Some protected areas of this ecoregion include:
Denetiah Provincial Park and Protected Area
Kusawa Territorial Park
Nahanni National Park Reserve
Neʼāhʼ Conservancy
Spatsizi Plateau Wilderness Provincial Park
Tā Chʼilā Provincial Park

See also
List of ecoregions in Canada (WWF)

References

External links 

Ecozones and ecoregions of British Columbia
Ecozones and ecoregions of Yukon
Forests of British Columbia
Nearctic ecoregions
Temperate coniferous forests